Thera is a Greek island also known as Santorini.

Thera or Thira may also refer to:

Places
 Thera, one of the ancient names of the city of Gümüşhane, Turkey
 Thera (Caria), a town of ancient Caria, now in Turkey
 Thira (crater), impact crater on Mars
 Thira (regional unit) of Greece

Monks
 Thero or "Thera", an honorific term for senior, fully ordained Buddhist monks; traditionally one ordained for 10 or more years
 Thero, an elder monk of Theravada Buddhism; hence its etymology "Thera-vada", "Tradition of the Elders"

Arts, entertainment, and media
 Thera, the capital of the fictional Theran Empire, in the tabletop role-playing game Earthdawn
 Thira (film), a 2013 Malayalam thriller film
 Thirra, a ritual dance performed in temples of Malabar

Other uses
 Thera (moth), a genus of moth

See also
 Fira, the main municipality of Santorini
 Tera (disambiguation)
 Terra (disambiguation)
 Thara (disambiguation)